Circe was a goddess or sorceress in Greek mythology.

Circe may also refer to:

Places
 Mount Circe, a mountain peak in Antarctica
 34 Circe, a large, main-belt asteroid
 Dome C, also known as Dome Circe, a summit or dome of the Antarctic Ice Sheet

Books, theatre and film
 Circe (comics) a DC comics character
 Circe (film), a 1964 Argentine film
 Circe (novel), a 2018 novel by Madeline Miller
 "Circe" (Ulysses episode) an episode in James Joyce's novel Ulysses
 La Circe, a 1624 poem by Lope de Vega
 Circé, a machine play by Thomas Corneille

Music
 Circé (Desmarets), a 1694 opera by Henri Desmaret
 La Circe (Ziani), a 1665 opera by Pietro Antonio Ziani
La Circe, a 1668 serenata by Alessandro Stradella
 La Circe (Mysliveček), a 1779 opera by Josef Mysliveček
La Circe, a 1782 opera by Cimarosa
La Circe, a 1789 pasticcio by Haydn

Ships
 HMS Circe, several ships of the British Royal Navy
 USS Circe, two United States Navy ships
 Circé-class submarine (1907), deployed by the French Navy before and during World War I
 French submarine Circé (Q 47), a submarine of that class sunk in September 1918
 Circé class submarine (1925), deployed by the French Navy before and during World War II
 French submarine Circé, a submarine of that class scuttled in 1943
 Circe, a Spica class torpedo boat of the Royal Italian Navy

Other uses
 Circe (bivalve), a genus of venus clams
 Circe chess, a variant of chess
 Hestina nama, a brush-footed butterfly commonly known as the Circe
 Circe, a synonym for Aglantha, a genus of deep-sea hydrozoans

See also
Circe in popular culture
Surtsey, a volcanic island off the coast of Iceland
 Cersei Lannister, a character in the A Song of Ice and Fire epic fantasy novel series by George R.R. Martin, and its television series Game of Thrones
Sersi, a character in Marvel Comics
Sersi (Marvel Cinematic Universe), the film version of the character